Liberty County High School is a public high school located in Hinesville, Georgia, United States. The school is part of the Liberty County School District, which serves Liberty County.

During the era of segregation the school competed in the Georgia Interscholastic Association.

Notable alumni
 Raekwon McMillan (born 1995), football player
Jordan McRae (born 1991), basketball player for Hapoel Tel Aviv of the Israeli Basketball Premier League
 Davion Mitchell (born 1998), basketball player
 Tony Royster Jr., drummer
 Bryan Sears, sprinter

References

External links
 Liberty County High School

Public high schools in Georgia (U.S. state)
Schools in Liberty County, Georgia